Rheingold is the 11th studio album by German heavy metal band Grave Digger. It is a concept album based on Richard Wagner's The Ring of the Nibelung. The album was released in 2003.  Many lines of the lyrics are quoted or paraphrased from (an English translation of) Wagner. The music also has occasional references to Wagner, the most obvious one perhaps being the intro to the song "Dragon", which is the "Siegfried's Horn Call" leitmotif.

Track listing
All songs are composed and arranged by Boltendahl/Becker/Katzenburg/Schmidt; all lyrics by Boltendahl.

Album line-up 
 Chris Boltendahl - vocals
 Manni Schmidt - guitars
 Jens Becker - bass
 Stefan Arnold - drums
 H.P. Katzenburg - keyboards

Grave Digger (band) albums
2003 albums
Concept albums
Nuclear Blast albums